The Galați Airport was an airport located in Galați, Romania, that operated from 1926 to 1958.

History
The operations of the Galați Airport started on 24 June 1926. At the time, Galați had high relevance for the Kingdom of Romania, both because of its port on the Danube and for being regarded as an important crossroad between Muntenia, where the Romanian capital Bucharest was located, and Bessarabia, which belonged to Romania at the time.

On 6 June 1944, during the Allies' Operation Frantic, the Galați Airport was heavily bombed. 98% of its buildings, facilities and vehicles were destroyed, thirteen soldiers were killed and the airport was left unoperational. After the war, it continued to be used until 1958 when the Galați Airport was abolished on the premise of being ineffective and inducing a loss of money.

In recent years, there have been efforts between the Brăila and Galați counties to achieve the construction of a new airport in the area serving both Brăila and Galați.

See also
 List of airports in Romania

References

Galați
Defunct airports in Romania
Airports established in 1926
1926 establishments in Romania
Airports disestablished in 1958
1958 disestablishments in Romania